Marcin Dariusz Nowak (born 26 June 1979 in Tomaszów Mazowiecki) is a Polish former professional footballer who played as a defender.

External links
 
 

1979 births
Living people
People from Tomaszów Mazowiecki
Polish footballers
Polish expatriate footballers
Piast Gliwice players
Pogoń Szczecin players
FC Volyn Lutsk players
Widzew Łódź players
RKS Radomsko players
Górnik Polkowice players
MKP Pogoń Siedlce players
Pelikan Łowicz players
Ekstraklasa players
I liga players
II liga players
III liga players
Ukrainian Premier League players
Expatriate footballers in Ukraine
Sportspeople from Łódź Voivodeship
Polish expatriate sportspeople in Ukraine
Association football defenders